Triplett Run is a stream in the U.S. state of West Virginia.

Triplett Run most likely was named after William Triplett, a pioneer settler.

See also
List of rivers of West Virginia

References

Rivers of Roane County, West Virginia
Rivers of West Virginia